Our Lady of Pellevoisin is a title of the Blessed Virgin Mary which refers to a series of Marian apparitions in Pellevoisin, in the province of Berry, in the department of Indre,  France. Pellevoisin is west of Châteauroux in the Catholic Archdiocese of Bourges.

In 1876, a domestic servant, Estelle Faguette, reported receiving a series of fifteen apparitions of the Blessed Virgin Mary, and recovered from a serious illness, tuberculosis. A distinctive feature of Faguette's apparitions was her claim that the Virgin wished her devotees to wear a Scapular of the Sacred Heart.

Following authorization by the Archbishop of Bourges in 1877, Faguette's bedroom was transformed into an oratory. Pellevoisin rapidly became a place of pilgrimage, the shrine of Our Lady of Pellevoisin. Pope Leo XIII encouraged the pilgrimages by approving indulgences to pilgrims, and also approved related devotions to Our Lady.

In 1983, Archbishop Paul Vignancour of Bourges formally declared Faguette's cure to be inexplicable in the light of medical science and that her recovery could rightly be regarded as a miracle by Catholics.

Estelle Faguette

Estelle Faguette was born 12 September 1843 at Saint-Memmie near Châlons-sur-Marne and joined the Children of Mary at the age of 14. She entered an order of Augustinian nursing sisters, but left while still a novice. She tripped and fell on a staircase; although the sprain seemed trivial at first, two weeks later, her leg was immobilised and doctors considered amputation. On 15 September 1863, Faguette reluctantly accepted that she could not pursue the life of a nursing sister and returned to her parents’ home.

The apparitions
At the time of the apparitions, Pellevoisin was the commercial centre for around a thousand citizens under the authority of the village mayor, Comte de la Rochefoucauld. His wife employed Estelle Faguette as a domestic servant and nursemaid at their residence near Pellevoisin, the Château de Poiriers-Montbel. A woman of fragile health, after numerous years in service, Faguette was dying of tuberculosis at the age of 33.

With childlike faith, Faguette composed a letter to the Blessed Virgin Mary in which she asked for a cure. The letter was laid at the feet of a statue of the Virgin in Montbel, the summer chateau of the Rochefoucaulds, about 3 km from Pellevoisin.

In February 1876, the Countess had to travel to Paris but arranged for accommodation to be made available for Faguette in a house close to the parish church in Pellevoisin. Unable to consume anything except liquids, Faguette received the sacrament of extreme unction. On 14 February, her physician judged that she had only hours left to live.

During the night of that same day, Faguette reported experiencing the presence of the Virgin Mary for the first time, who told her that she must suffer for five more days in honour of the five wounds of Christ. At the end of the five days, Faguette would die or be cured; and if she lived, she would obliged to make known ‘Mary’s glory’.

On each of the following four nights the Blessed Virgin again appeared to Faguette. On Tuesday, she said: 'If my son grants you life, it will be a blessing for you.' On Wednesday, she said, 'I am all-merciful and the mistress of my Son. Your good deed, fervent prayers and little letter have touched my motherly heart'.

On Friday night, Mary did not come and stand at the foot of the bed, as on the previous nights, but drew close to her. She showed Faguette the plaque which she must have placed as a thanksgiving, bearing the words: 'I called upon Mary in the depths of my misery. She obtained for me, from her Son, my complete cure.' The plaque was not plain white, but had a golden rose on each corner, and at the top, a heart on fire, crowned with roses, pierced by a sword. Indeed, on Saturday, Faguette was cured when she received Holy Communion. Immediately she was able to eat and drink normally, and within a few days, she resumed domestic and gardening duties with no sign of fatigue.

The next three apparitions occurred on three consecutive days in July, Saturday 1st - Monday 3rd. 'My son's heart is so full of love that he will not refuse my demands. I have chosen this particular place for the conversion of sinners. I would like you to remain very peaceful about this!'

The Blessed Virgin returned in September (Saturday 9, Sunday 10, Friday 15). On 9 September, the lady drew attention to a small scapular she was wearing. Faguette had seen it there before, as plain white cloth, but on this day it bore the red image of a heart. 'This devotion pleases me', Mary said, and then, 'It is here that I shall be honoured'. The lady next appeared on 15 September, speaking of her concern for the Catholic Church in France.

Three further visions followed in November (Wednesday 1, All Saints' Day; Sunday 5; Saturday 11). On 11 November, Faguette set about making a replica of the scapular which she had seen the lady wearing. On that day's apparition, the Virgin told Faguette 'You have been working for me'.

The final and culminating vision took place on Friday 8 December 1876, the Solemnity of the Immaculate Conception.

I have many graces in store for those who wear this scapular with trust in me. These graces are my Son's; I bring them from His Heart; he will refuse me nothing. The lady asked her to show the scapular to the local bishop and ask his assistance in promoting it.

Faguette died in Pellevoisin on 23 August 1929, a few weeks short of her 87th birthday.

Response of Catholic authorities
Initial enquiries were carried out by Charles-Amable de la Tour d'Auvergne, Archbishop of Bourges.

On 30 April 1876, with the permission of the archbishop, she had an ex voto plaque of thanksgiving placed in the parish church. On December 8, her bedroom was transformed into an oratory. A few days later, the archbishop received her for an interview and granted permission for her to make and distribute copies of the Scapular of the Sacred Heart.

In 1877, the archbishop set up an enquiry and interviewed 56 persons who knew Faguette; apart from one who preferred not to comment, all spoke favourably. A second enquiry was conducted in December 1878, with similar results.

A confraternity of the All-Merciful Mother was erected on 28 July 1877. No explicit mention was made of Pellevoisin in connection with its approval (but there was reference to Margaret Mary Alacoque, a nun who had received visions of the Sacred Heart of Jesus). Its statutes were approved on August 27.

In 1892, Pope Leo XIII offered two signs of favour to the shrine: awarding a candle, and declaring certain indulgences for pilgrims who visited it. On 8 May 1894, he raised the confraternity to the status of 'honorary Archconfraternity' and, on 12 May 1896, to 'effective Archconfraternity'. The Pope received Estelle Faguette in audiences on 30 January and 17–18 February 1900, during which he agreed that the relevant Vatican department, the Congregation of Rites, should consider authorising use of the Scapular of the Sacred Heart. Formal recognition was given on 4 April 1900.

In 1893, Archbishop Boyer invited the Dominican Friars to establish a monastery in a house close to her oratory.

In April 1897, Pierre-Paul Servonnet became Archbishop of Bourges. The same year, on 14 October, he renewed permissions given by his predecessors for information about the shrine to be published. In 1899, following numerous petitions from France and Canada, he opened a third canonical enquiry, which again found her to be a credible witness.

On 16 April 1903, Madame de la Rochefoucauld, who still had administrative rights over the property containing the oratory, closed it to the public. The annual pilgrimage still took place on 9 September 1903 with a crowd gathering at the railings of the property; 40 police officers attended. On 19 July 1905, Archbishop Servonnet issued an order that crowds must not gather in front of the oratory.

On 17 October 1915, Pope Benedict XV commented that Our Lady had chosen Pellevoisin as a privileged place to dispense her graces.

On 22 December 1922, the Congregation of Rites authorised a votive Mass of Our Lady of Pellevoisin to be celebrated on 9 September in the parish church and adjoining monastery.

On 7 June 1936, by the hand of Cardinal Pacelli (who later became Pope Pius XII), Pius XI sent a painting of Our Lady of Pellevoisin as a gift to the Dominican community.

On 7 December 1981, Archbishop Paul Vignancour established a medical commission to examine the apparently miraculous cure. On 6 September 1982, having received its report that the cure was still inexplicable in the light of current medical science, Vignacour established a theological commission to consider whether this cure might appropriately be called 'miraculous'. On 4 September 1983, while speaking at the annual pilgrimage to Pellevoisin, he announced the commission's findings that the cure had a 'miraculous character'. That was formally confirmed, in writing, on 8 September.

On 19 September 1984, an Imprimatur was granted for a novena to Our Lady of Pellevoisin.

Current Marian shrine

The Sanctuary of Our Lady of Pellevoisin was under the care of the Dominican friars for 105 years from 1895, but since 1998, it has been served by friars and sisters of the Community of Saint John. A community of contemplative sisters form the Monastery of the Merciful Mother, and the friars form the Priory of Saint Mary Magdalen. The main spiritual activities are daily Mass at 11:30, a weekend celebrating God's mercy around the Second Sunday of Easter each year (Divine Mercy Sunday in the Roman Catholic Church) and the annual pilgrimage on the last weekend in August. Pilgrimages by groups and individuals are welcome throughout the year.

Notes

References

External links
 The Sanctuary of Our Lady of Pellevoisin – Official website
 Photo gallery of a pilgrimage to Pellevoisin

Titles of Mary
Pellevoisin